Santa Barbara Machine Head were a short-lived British electric blues combo that formed and disbanded in 1967. They recorded three instrumental songs together for Immediate Records; "Albert", "Porcupine Juice" and "Rubber Monkey", written by Jon Lord and Gus Dudgeon, released in 1968 on the compilation album Blues Anytime Vol. 3. All four members later went on to achieve success and notoriety with other bands.

Members
John "Twink" Alder - drums
Kim Gardner - bass
Jon Lord - keyboards
Ronnie Wood - guitar

References

British blues musical groups
Immediate Records artists
Musical groups from London
Musical groups established in 1967
Musical groups disestablished in 1967